Lady Patricia Andrade Rodríguez (born 10 January 1992) is a Colombian professional footballer who plays for Spanish Primera División club Deportivo de La Coruña and the Colombia women's national team. She is an attacking midfielder who can also play as a striker.

Club career
Andrade signed for Finnish Naisten Liiga club PK-35 Vantaa in the spring of 2013.

She was signed by the Western New York Flash of the NWSL on 7 July 2015. She was waived by the Flash on 20 May 2016.

In September 2016, she moved to Turkey and signed a three-year contract with 1207 Antalyaspor. In the first match of the Turkish First Football League's 2016–17 season, she scored two goals, and helped her team win the match 2–1.

On 10 February 2017, She moved to the new Colombian Football League to play for Santa Fe, and won a championship. A season later she played for Atletico National and won the league again.

On 16 July 2019, Andrade officially signed A.C. Milan in the Italian Serie A. She had originally joined the team in August 2018 but visa complications prevented her from being signed.

International career
Andrade has represented Colombia at the 2010 U-20 Women's World Cup, making 5 appearances and scoring one goal, at the 2011 Women's World Cup, making one appearance, at the 2015 Women's World Cup, making four appearances and scoring two goals, and at the 2012 and 2016 Summer Olympics, making five total appearances. In a group match at the 2012 Olympics against the United States, she punched opposition player Abby Wambach in the right eye, resulting in a two-game ban.

Andrade made her mark on the world stage during the 2015 Women's World Cup in Canada. Andrade was Colombia's top scorer at the competition with two goals.

References

External links 
 

1992 births
Living people
Women's association football midfielders
Women's association football forwards
Colombian women's footballers
Footballers from Bogotá
Colombia women's international footballers
2011 FIFA Women's World Cup players
2015 FIFA Women's World Cup players
Olympic footballers of Colombia
Footballers at the 2012 Summer Olympics
Footballers at the 2016 Summer Olympics
Pan American Games gold medalists for Colombia
Pan American Games medalists in football
Footballers at the 2019 Pan American Games
Primera División (women) players
Sporting de Huelva players
PK-35 Vantaa (women) players
National Women's Soccer League players
Western New York Flash players
1207 Antalya Spor players
Serie A (women's football) players
A.C. Milan Women players
Colombian expatriate women's footballers
Colombian expatriate sportspeople in Spain
Expatriate women's footballers in Spain
Colombian expatriate sportspeople in Finland
Expatriate women's footballers in Finland
Colombian expatriate sportspeople in the United States
Expatriate women's soccer players in the United States
Colombian expatriate sportspeople in Turkey
Expatriate women's footballers in Turkey
Colombian expatriate sportspeople in Italy
Expatriate women's footballers in Italy
Deportivo de La Coruña (women) players
Medalists at the 2019 Pan American Games
21st-century Colombian women